Salford Priors railway station was a railway station located in the village of Salford Priors, Warwickshire, England. Opened on 16 June 1866 (17 September for passengers) as part of the Evesham & Redditch Railway, it had only one platform but a brick built waiting room/ticket office and station master's house. It closed on 17 June 1963, although the last train ran on 1 October 1962, after which the train service was suspended due to the poor condition of the track.  A bus service replaced it while the statutory closure process was gone through.

The station building itself is still in existence, little changed and used as an office building. The goods shed still stands.

References

Further reading

Disused railway stations in Warwickshire
Railway stations in Great Britain opened in 1866
Railway stations in Great Britain closed in 1963
1866 establishments in England
Former Midland Railway stations